Wongtawan na Chiengmai, Prince Ratchabut (May 7, 1886 – May 25, 1972) was a Thai royal from Chiang Mai.

Biography
Wongtawan na Chiengmai was born on May 7, 1886. In the Thai calendar he was born on Friday the 5th waxing moon of the 6th month of the year of the dog (Picho). He was the son of Maj. Gen. Chao Kaeo Naowarat and Mae Chao Chamari. He had the nickname "Chaomu." In 1897 he began his studies at The Prince Royal's College in Chiang Mai and in 1898 he transferred to the Ratchawitthayalai School in Bangkok. In 1901 he moved back to Chiang Mai.

He married Princess Chanthon, maiden name Na Chiang Mai, and the two had one daughter, Princess Wongchan. He later married Princess Phathra, maiden name Na Lamphun. With her, he had two daughters, Princess Phongkaeo and Princess Rawiphan. Afterwards he married Mom Sinuan, maiden name Nanthakhwang of Lamphun Province.

Before his death, he lived at Khum Wongtawan. Wongtawan na Chiengmai died at the Nakhon Chiang Mai Hospital on May 25, 1972. He was 86 years and 18 days old. A royal cremation ceremony was held afterwards.

His daughter, Princess Phongkaeo died on Lauda Air Flight 004 in 1991.

References

1886 births
1972 deaths
Wongtawan na Chiengmai
Wongtawan na Chiengmai
Wongtawan na Chiengmai
Wongtawan na Chiengmai